Richard Champion de Crespigny  (born 31 May 1957) is an Australian Qantas pilot and author who served as pilot-in-command of Qantas Flight 32 and was widely praised for his cockpit resource management during the emergency with his crew (first officer Matt Hicks, second officer Mark Johnson, check captain Harry Wubben, and check captain David Evans); despite the Airbus A380 suffering an uncontained engine failure that resulted in severe damage to much of the aircraft, triggering dozens of ECAM warnings, and puncturing the fuel tanks, the crew managed to safely land the plane at Changi Airport in Singapore. Passengers, the media, and the ATSB praised de Crespigny for his professional handling of the emergency, and in 2016 he was awarded the Order of Australia for his contributions to aviation safety. He has since written two books  QF32, detailing the flight and its aftermath, and FLY!  - the Elements of Resilience.

Military career 
De Crespigny decided he wanted to become a pilot after touring Point Cook Air Base in Victoria when he was 14. He went on to join the RAAF at age 17 in 1975. During his first training flight the instructor did not stop him from putting the plane into a downward spiral, after which he left de Crespigny to stop the plane from plummeting to the ground alone. The incident left him terrified but heightened his awareness of the dangers of complacency and human error in flight. In 1982 he was posted to the Air Force VIP jets for a short time, but soon he became certified as a helicopter pilot and was deployed to El Gorah, Egypt. While he was accepted into training to fly the F-111, he never went on to become a fighter pilot.

Civil aviation 
Shortly after leaving the military for Qantas in 1986, he took a break from flying to establish Aeronaut Industries Pty Ltd (a computer software company) due to a recession in the aviation industry reducing the number of jobs available for pilots. During this period he did complete an annual flight check during the two-year break. After returning to Qantas full time he converted to flying the 747-400, having previously been a pilot of the 747-200 and 747-300 "classic" aircraft. In 2004 he switched to flying the Airbus A330, and in 2008 he was certified to fly the A380. He retired from commercial flying in 2020 due to the ongoing COVID-19 restrictions and low demand for international travel.

Qantas 32 
On 4 November 2010 de Crespigny was serving as pilot-in-command of Qantas Flight 32 while also undergoing a route check. The A380 under his command suffered an uncontained engine failure several minutes after leaving Singapore Changi Airport. Despite facing over 50 ECAM warning checklists and having limited use of many critical systems on the aircraft, including brakes, hydraulics, and electronics, the crew managed to bring the plane back to the airport and make an emergency landing. After the landing engine number ''one'' had to be forcefully shut down by firefighting foam before passengers could disembark safety since it was not responding to inputs by the flight controls and the pressurized water failed to shut it down. Once in the airport terminal he reassured the passengers and answered questions. While a passenger on a 747 flight home, he experienced another engine failure, albeit much less severe, that forced the plane to turn around and left him in Singapore for a few more days.

Books

See also
 Chesley Sullenberger
 Alfred Clair Haynes
 Tammie Jo Shults

References

External links

Members of the Order of Australia
Aviators from Melbourne
Living people
1957 births